Raeco is an unincorporated community in King County, in the U.S. state of Washington.

History
A post office called Raeco was established in 1907, and remained in operation until 1911. The community's name is an acronym of the surnames Rhodes, Appel, and Earnest.

References

Unincorporated communities in King County, Washington
Unincorporated communities in Washington (state)